Crataegus × dsungarica is a hawthorn that is a hybrid between C. songarica in C. sect. Crataegus and  C. wattiana in C. sect. Sanguineae. It has been placed in nothosection Crataeguineae. It has blackish purple fruit.

See also 
 List of hawthorn species with black fruit

References

dsungarica